New Barrackpore is a city and a municipality of North 24 Parganas district in the Indian state of West Bengal. It is close to Kolkata & a part of the area covered by Kolkata Metropolitan Development Authority (KMDA).

Geography

Location
96% of the population of Barrackpore subdivision (partly presented in the map alongside, all places marked in the map are linked in the full screen map) lives in urban areas. In 2011, it had a density of population of 10,967 per km2. The subdivision has 16 municipalities and 24 census towns. For most of the cities/ towns information regarding density of population is available in the Infobox. Population data is not available for neighbourhoods. It is available for the entire Municipal area and thereafter ward-wise.

Police station
New Barrackpore police station is under Barrackpore Police Commissionerate which also has jurisdiction over New Barrackpore Municipal areas.

Demographics

Population
As per the 2011 Census of India, New Barrackpore had a total population of 76,846, of which 38,239 (50%) were males and 38,607 (50%) were females. Population below 6 years was 5,157. The total number of literates in New Barrackpore was 67,384 (93.99% of the population over 6 years).Hindus form almost 99% of the total population.

 Indian census, New Barrackpore had a population of 83,183. Males constitute 50% of the population and females 50%.  In New Barrackpore, 7% of the population is under 6 years of age. The literacy rate is 95.19% where the male literacy rate is 97.66% and female literacy rate is 92.72%.

Kolkata Urban Agglomeration
The following Municipalities, Census Towns and other locations in Barrackpore subdivision were part of Kolkata Urban Agglomeration in the 2011 census: Kanchrapara (M), Jetia (CT), Halisahar (M), Balibhara (CT), Naihati (M), Bhatpara (M), Kaugachhi (CT), Garshyamnagar (CT), Garulia (M), Ichhapur Defence Estate (CT), North Barrackpur (M), Barrackpur Cantonment (CB), Barrackpore (M), Jafarpur (CT), Ruiya (CT), Titagarh (M), Khardaha (M), Bandipur (CT), Panihati (M), Muragachha (CT) New Barrackpore (M), Chandpur (CT), Talbandha (CT), Patulia (CT), Kamarhati (M), Baranagar (M), South Dumdum (M), North Dumdum (M), Dum Dum (M), Noapara (CT), Babanpur (CT), Teghari (CT), Nanna (OG), Chakla (OG), Srotribati (OG) and Panpur (OG).

Infrastructure
As per the District Census Handbook 2011, New Barrackpore Municipal town covered an area of 6.89 km2. Amongst the civic amenities it had 120.51 km of roads and open drains. Amongst the educational facilities It had 60 primary schools, 11 middle schools, 10 secondary schools, 8 senior secondary schools, 2 degree colleges in arts/science/commerce and 10 non-formal education centres. Amongst the social, recreational and cultural facilities it had 1 cinema/theatre, 2 auditorium/ community halls, 4 public libraries and 1 reading room. Amongst the commodities manufactured were foam bags, gloves and musical instruments. It had 4 bank branches.

See also Cities and towns in Barrackpore subdivision

Economy

As part of KMDA
New Barrackpore Municipality is included in the Kolkata Metropolitan Area for which the Kolkata Metropolitan Development Authority is the statutory planning and development authority.

Transport

Road
New Barrackpore town is situated near Jessore Road/National Highway 12. The bus stop near New Barrackpore on Jessore Road is B.T. College and many buses pass through here. The only bus (Mini bus) that enters into New Barrackpore is S175 (New Barrackpore railway station - Howrah Station).

Train
New Barrackpore railway station, which is on the Sealdah-Bangaon line, is 17 km from Sealdah railway station. It is part of the Kolkata Suburban Railway system.

Air
Dumdum/Kolkata Airport is only 5 kilometres away.

Education
New Barrackpore has three colleges which are G.C.M. College of Education, Acharya Prafulla Chandra College, Acharya Prafulla Chandra College for Commerce.

The higher secondary schools for boys are New Barrackpore Colony Boys High School, Masunda Boys High School, Kodalia Boys High School, Sahara Boys High School, Satin Sen Nagar Boys High School.

The higher secondary schools for girls are New Barrackpore Colony Girls High School, Masunda Girls High School, Tapati Balika Vidhyabithi, Sahara Girls High School.

Culture
New Barrackpore hosts 'Pushpa Mela' every winter with many fascinating collections of many enterprising florists. 'Kristi' is a community auditorium where cultural events are often held.

Temples
Choto Bot Tala Kali Temples is very famous with the local people. Maa Samsan Kali Temple at Sajirhat is also attended by many devotees. A Kali temple made by Mr. Haripada Biswas attached to New Barrackpore Colony Girl's High School (formerly known Kalibari School) is also very famous.

References

External links

 New Barrackpore Municipality, website
 New Barrackpore Municipality online

Cities and towns in North 24 Parganas district
Neighbourhoods in Kolkata
Kolkata Metropolitan Area
Cities in West Bengal